Peter Rice (16 June 1935 – 25 October 1992) was an Irish structural engineer.
Born in Dublin, he grew up in 52 Castle Road, Dundalk in County Louth, and spent his childhood between the town of Dundalk, and the villages of Gyles' Quay and Inniskeen. He was educated at Queen's University of Belfast where he received his primary degree, and spent a year at Imperial College London. Rice acted as Structural Engineer on three of the most important architectural works of the 20th century: the Sydney Opera House (with Ove Arup), Pompidou Centre and the Lloyd's Building and was renowned for his innate ability to act as both engineer and designer.

He originally studied Aeronautical Engineering but switched to Civil Engineering. Taken on by Ove Arup & Partners, his first job was the roof of the Sydney Opera House. He married Sylvia Watson in 1960 and they had one son and three daughters. Jonathan Glancey in his obituary said "Rice was, perhaps, the James Joyce of structural engineering. His poetic invention, his ability to turn accepted ideas on their head and his rigorous mathematical and philosophical logic made him one of the most sought-after engineers of our times".

Philosophy

He believed the best buildings result from the symbiotic relationship between the architect and the engineer where the engineer is the objective inventor and the architect the creative input. He found the Anglo Saxon understanding of the work of an engineer restrictive and preferred the French and Italian interpretation of the role.

Work

Among the notable buildings on whose design he worked are the Centre Pompidou, the Sydney Opera House, Lloyd's of London, the Louvre Pyramid, the Mound Stand at Lord's Cricket Ground, Kansai International Airport and Stansted Airport. Towards the end of his life he was largely responsible for the new façade of Lille Cathedral.

Career

Sydney Opera House

In 1956, he joined Ove Arup & Partners. In 1957, he took leave to pursue post-graduate studies at Imperial College rejoining Arups in 1958. After three years working on Jørn Utzon shells for the roof of the Sydney Opera House in London, where he is credited with having done the geometry for the problematic design, he moved to Sydney to be an assistant engineer to Ian MacKenzie. After one month MacKenzie fell ill and was hospitalised, leaving Rice in total charge at the age of 28. On-site his geometrical knowledge enabled him to write a computer program to locate the segments of the shells correctly. In total he spent seven years working on the project. Afterwards, he spent 18 months in the United States, in New York City and as visiting scholar at Cornell University.

Pompidou Centre (Beaubourg)

In 1971, he was part of the winning team competing in the French government's competition for the centre of Paris at Beaubourg, partnering Richard Rogers and Renzo Piano. Edmund Happold was the senior Arup engineer for the competition. Rice became the engineer for the built project which was greatly modified from the initial design. Art and technology were intertwined in the design enabling him to experiment with materials. He specified that these were to be made in cast steel. After the Pompidou Centre, Rice set up his own company in 1977—"RFR"—along with Martin Francis and Ian Ritchie although he continued with Arup as a partner. In 1978 he was involved with Rogers again, this time on Lloyd's of London, completed in 1984. During this time his other projects encompassed the Fleetguard Factory at Quimper in France, and Stansted Airport in London.

Although Rice was based in London, where he worked with Michael Hopkins on the tented Mound Stand at Lord's, much of his work was in Paris, including the great glass walls of the Cité des Sciences at La Villette and the tent-like canopy that softens the monumentality of the Grand Arche at La Défense. In 1985 I. M. Pei asked his help with projects at the Louvre in Paris, namely the shell structures for the glass roofs that Pei planned to cover inner courtyards.

By then he was in great demand continuing to work with architects such as Richard Rogers, I. M. Pei, Norman Foster, Ian Ritchie, Kenzo Tange, Paul Andreu, and Renzo Piano. The projects he worked on ranged from Toronto's Opera House by Moshe Safdie to Kansai's International Airport, one of many projects with the Renzo Piano Building Workshop.

In addition to his huge output, he was known for his sympathetic attitude to design, his strategic approach, a cool head and managing to realise ambitious artistic designs in concrete reality. One of his marks as an engineer was the length of time he allowed to complete a project.

During his relatively short career, Rice's contribution to the built environment can be seen in the work of the recent Pritzker Prize winners, including Richard Rogers, Norman Foster, Renzo Piano, and Zaha Hadid.

Awards

In 1992, he was the second engineer to be awarded the Royal Gold Medal for Architecture by the Royal Institute of British Architects (the first was Ove Arup), and the second Irishman after Michael Scott. The award is conferred by the Sovereign annually for work that has "promoted, either directly or indirectly, the advancement of architecture."

Death

He was diagnosed with a brain tumour in 1991 and died the following year aged 57. A sign has been put up outside his childhood home, 52 Castle Road, Dundalk, County Louth, saying "Birthplace of Peter Rice, Engineer, 1935–1992". The plaque was erected privately by the (then) Dundalk Town Architect, Paul Clancy.

Legacy

Rice's book, An Engineer Imagines, was posthumously published and came to be considered an important work in the history of building design.
The Peter Rice Prize was established at the Harvard University Graduate School of Design in 1994 in recognition of the ideals and principles represented by the late eminent engineer.
The Peter Rice Silver Medal competition was established at Dundalk Institute of Technology (his home town) in 1996 under the patronage of Ove Arup and Engineers Ireland (Institution of Engineers of Ireland). This medal is awarded annually, to the best presentation by an engineering student of the institute on their practical project activity.
In 2019, a documentary by Marcus Robinson, An Engineer Imagines, was screened by Channel 4 and in cinemas.

Bibliography

An Engineer Imagines, Peter Rice (Ellipsis Press, 1998)
An Engineer Imagines, Peter Rice (Artemis, 1994)
Structural Glass, Hugh Dutton, Peter Rice (Routledge; 2001)
Transparente Architektur, Glasfassaden mit Structural Glazing, by H. Dutton, P. Rice (Birkhäuser Verlag; 1995)
Yutaka Saito in: Space design, 8/1992,335 by Y. Saito, O. Murai, K. Nanba, M. Ueda, P. Rice, T. Shinoda (p. 5 – 188)
Building a show: The Bastille Dances, by Station House Opera in: The Architects' Journal, 6/1989, by P. Rice (p. 72–73) – performance review
Design for better assembly, case study: Rogers' and Arup's in: The Architects' Journal, 36/1984, by J. Young, P. Rice, J. Thornton (p. 87–94)
Menil Collection Museum roof: evolving the form in: Arup journal, 2/1987, by P. Rice (p. 2–5)
Rogers revolution: Lloyd's remarkable new headquarters in: Building Design, 1986,807, by P. Rice (p. 32–33)
Il punto di vista di Peter Rice | An engineer's view in: L'Arca, 1987,5, by P. Rice (p. 70–75)
Unstable structures in: Columbia documents of architecture and theory, 1992, by P. Rice (p. 71–89)
Stratégie de l'araignée in: L'architecture d'aujourd'hui, 1987,252, by P. Rice (p. 78–79)
Menil Collection museum roof: evolving the form in: Offramp, 1991,4 by P. Rice (p. 117–119)
Gleichgewicht und Spannung | Equilibre et tension in: Archithese, 2/1990, by P. Rice (p. 84–96)
Konstruktive Intelligenz in: arch+: Rhetorik des Machens, 1990,102, by G. Behnisch, C. Vasconi, O. Aicher, J. Nouvel, H. C. Schulitz, P. Rice, R. Rogers, S. Polónyi, H. von Malotki (p. 42–52)
Traces of Peter Rice, Kevin Barry (ed) (Lilliput Press, 2017)

Projects

Sydney Opera House, Sydney, Australia; 1957
Crucible Theatre, Sheffield; 1967
Amberly Road Children's Home, London; 1969
National Sports Centre, Crystal Palace, London; 1970
Arts Centre, University of Warwick, Coventry; 1970
Perspex spiral staircase, Andrew Grima jewellery shop, 80 Jermyn Street, London; 1970

Super Grimentz Ski Village, Valais, Switzerland; 1970
Conference Centre, Mecca, Saudi Arabia; 1971
Special structures advice to Frei Otto and others on pneumatic and cable structures including "The City in the Arctic"; 1971
Centre Pompidou (Beaubourg), Paris, France; 1971
Jumbo jet hangar, Johannesburg, South Africa; 1976
TGV Station Lille; 1994
Mobiles Zelt in London London; 1992
TGV Station Roissy; 1991–94
Elektronikfabrik Thomson Saint-Quentin-en-Yvelines; 1990
Umbau des Louvre Paris-1er; 1988–93
Cité des Sciences et de l'Industrie Paris-19e; 1986
De Menil Collection Houston; 1981–86
IBM Pavillon 1980–84
'Quartierslaboratorium' für Stadterneuerung Otranto; 1979
Residential Complex Corciano; 1978–82
'Pabellón del Futuro; Seville, Spain; 1992

References

External links

RFR
Peter Rice Exhibition at Arup Phase 2 Gallery, London
The Imaginative Engineer
Barry, Kevin, ed. Traces of Peter Rice. Dublin: Lilliput Press, 2012
G. Kerr, ‘Peter Rice: Performing Instability’

1935 births
1992 deaths
Alumni of Imperial College London
Alumni of Queen's University Belfast
Fellows of the Royal Academy of Engineering
20th-century Irish engineers
Ove Arup
People from Dublin (city)
People from Dundalk
Recipients of the Royal Gold Medal
Structural engineers